Ulobetasol propionate, also known as halobetasol propionate and sold under the brand name Ultravate among others, is a synthetic glucocorticoid corticosteroid and a corticosteroid ester.

It was patented in 1975 and approved for medical use in 1990.

References

External links
 

Corticosteroid esters
Glucocorticoids